= Tando Jan Muhammad railway station =

Railway station in Pakistan

Coordinates: 25.056498°N 69.219255°E

General information
- Owner: Ministry of Railways

Other information
- Station code: TJMD

History
- Former names: Great Indian Peninsula Railway
Location

Tando Jan Muhammad railway station (Urdu: ٹنڈو جان محمد ریلوے اسٹیشن) is located in Pakistan.

== See also ==
- List of railway stations in Pakistan
- Pakistan Railways
